The Medical University of Graz is a public medical university located in Graz, Austria.

History 

The faculty of medicine at the Karl-Franzens-University of Graz was established in 1863 by Franz Joseph I. In 2004, the former faculty became an independent university.

Curriculum 

On 8 October 2012, the Medical University of Graz became the first university in Austria to celebrate a White Coat Ceremony of its third-year students.

References

External links 
 Austrian National Students' Union at the Medical University Graz
 LKH University Hospital Graz
 Students' Portal & Forum at the Medical University Graz

Medical schools in Austria
Universities and colleges in Austria
Educational institutions established in 2004
2004 establishments in Austria